Solenosmilia variabilis is a species of colonial coral in the family Caryophylliidae. It is a deep water, azooxanthellate coral with a semi-cosmopolitan distribution.

Description
Solenosmilia variabilis grows into small bushy colonies, the dichotomous branches often joining together. It grows from an encrusting base on which there are a few corallites. The branches are thick near the base of the colony but more slender above; sometimes upper branches are just  in diameter. The coenosteum can be smooth and white, granular, glossy and pale grey, or ridged with eight to ten transverse costae. Growth of the colony is by intratentacular budding.

Distribution
S. variabilis has a semi-cosmopolitan distribution. It is widespread in both the Atlantic and Indian Oceans and has a circumpolar distribution in the Southern Ocean. Locations where it has been found include off South Africa, off Prince Edward Island, off Île Saint-Paul, off southeastern Australia, off New Zealand, off South Orkney Islands, off Tristan Island, on the Hjort Seamount (south of Macquarie Island), on the Macquarie Ridge, and on seamounts in the South Pacific and Drake Passage.

Ecology
S. variabilis is a widespread species of deep sea reef-building coral; in the southwestern Pacific it is the dominant coral species on seamounts and rocky substrates in the depth range . In this location, it is a major part of a diverse community which is easily damaged by deepwater trawling.

References

Caryophylliidae
Cnidarians of the Atlantic Ocean
Cnidarians of the Indian Ocean
Cnidarians of the Pacific Ocean
Fauna of the Southern Ocean
Animals described in 1873